Leo Christopher "Lee" Magee (born Leopold Christopher Hoernschemeyer; June 4, 1889 – March 14, 1966) was a Major League Baseball player and manager between 1911 and 1919. He was the first Major League player to record five straight hits. While he played the majority of his professional games in the outfield, he also played the infield frequently.
In 1915, he was a player/manager for the Brooklyn Tip-Tops of the Federal League for most of the season. The team was 53-64 under his management.

Professional career

Magee signed with the Seattle Turks of the Northwestern League for the 1909 season. The Oregonian noted "To provide against a possible loss of [Pug] Bennett, [Dan] Dugdale signed Lee Magee, a fast youngster, who so far has justified the advance press dope of his touters that he handles himself in the field like Johnny Evers." On August 19, 1909 Magee was sold to the St. Louis Cardinals by the Seattle Turks of the Northwestern League.

In 1915, Magee was sued by the St. Louis Cardinals after he jumped to the Brooklyn Tip-Tops in the Federal League. James A. Gilmore, president of the Federal League, instructed Magee to ignore the suit.

In 1015 games over nine seasons, Magee posted a .276 batting average (1031-for-3741) with 467 runs, 133 doubles, 54 triples, 12 home runs, 277 RBI, 186 stolen bases and 265 bases on balls. Defensively, he finished his career with an overall .962 fielding percentage.

Banishment

As a ballplayer with the Chicago Cubs, Magee and Hal Chase of the Philadelphia Phillies were accused of fixing a game on August 31, 1919 by the Cook County, Illinois grand jury investigating the Black Sox scandal. In response Cubs president Bill Veeck released Magee. Magee filed suit against the Cubs for $9,500 in lost wages and bonuses in 1920. He claimed to have damning evidence which would be the "biggest bomb in baseball history". The jury ruled in favor of the Cubs on June 9, 1920.

Personal life

Magee was accused by Fred W. Kleine of St. Louis, Missouri in a reply to his wife Harriet Kleine's petition for divorce, with a charge that Harriet would meet Magee and other baseball players at Robison Field and bring them home. In one instance in May 1910, Fred W. Kleine claimed he found his wife drinking beer with Magee, Jack Bliss and Kitty Knight. Another instance, according to Fred W. Kleine, his wife had to assist an inebriated Magee down their stairs. All of the players denied wrongdoing, but said they had been guests at the Kleine's house, which was across the street from the ballpark. Magee responded that it was a leg injury that made him require assistance down the Kleine's stairs. The Oregonian noted that "Magee's name in a divorce suit along with other ball players, is not much of a surprise. Lee was a handsome boy and women admired him. He had an escapade on a sleeping car when he was playing first [base] for Seattle, that took diplomacy on the part of president Dugdale to smooth over."

Magee married Beatrice Rogers in 1917 and during this time Magee petitioned the court in Cincinnati to legally change his name from Leopold Christopher Hoernschemeyer to Lee Magee. According to The Oregonian this was done so his wife would be known as Mrs. Magee following their marriage.

See also
List of Major League Baseball career stolen bases leaders
List of Major League Baseball player-managers

References

External links

Joe Magee at SABR (Baseball BioProject)

1889 births
1966 deaths
Baseball players from Cincinnati
Major League Baseball outfielders
Major League Baseball second basemen
St. Louis Cardinals players
Brooklyn Tip-Tops players
Brooklyn Tip-Tops managers
New York Yankees players
St. Louis Browns players
Cincinnati Reds players
Brooklyn Robins players
Chicago Cubs players
Burlington Pathfinders players
Waterloo Cubs players
Waterloo Lulus players
Seattle Turks players
Louisville Colonels (minor league) players
Major League Baseball player-managers